Dora Louise Murdoch (1857-1933) was an American painter.

Biography
Murdoch was born on September 14, 1857 in New Haven, Connecticut. She studied in Paris, France where her teachers included, Bernard Boutet de Monvel, Gustave-Claude-Etienne Courtois, and Lucien Simon. 

She was a member of the American Federation of Arts, the American Watercolor Society, the Baltimore Watercolor Society, the New York Watercolor Society, and the Washington DC Watercolor Society. Her work was exhibited at the 1904 St. Louis World's Fair.

Murdoch died in 1933 in Baltimore, Maryland. Her work is in the collection of the National Gallery of Art.

References

External links

  
1857 births
1933 deaths
19th-century American women artists
20th-century American women artists
Artists from Connecticut
People from New Haven, Connecticut
American women painters
Painters from Connecticut